Scott Parker (born November 21, 1961 in Flint, Michigan) is an American professional motorcycle dirt track racer.

Racing career 
Parker is a nine-time winner of the A.M.A. Grand National Championship. He holds the all-time Grand National Dirt Track Championship record of 94 race wins and is a three-time winner of the AMA Pro Athlete of the Year Award.
 

Parker was inducted into the Motorsports Hall of Fame of America in 2009.

References

External links 
 Scott Parker Motorcycle Hall of Fame Museum Bio site

1961 births
Living people
American motorcycle racers
Sportspeople from Flint, Michigan